This table displays the top-rated primetime television series of the 1997–98 season as measured by Nielsen Media Research.

References

1997 in American television
1998 in American television
1997-related lists
1998-related lists
Lists of American television series